Howard Park P.S. 218, also known as School 7, is a historic elementary school located at Baltimore, Maryland, United States. It is an early 20th-century brick school building located in the intact historic west Baltimore neighborhood of Howard Park. The earliest school building was constructed in 1908 and enlarged in 1913, 1936, and in 1957.  The older sections are built of brick and accented with limestone details.  It continued to function as a school until 1980.

Howard Park P.S. 218 was listed on the National Register of Historic Places in 2000.

References

External links
, including photo from 1999, at Maryland Historical Trust

Defunct schools in Maryland
Buildings and structures in Baltimore
School buildings on the National Register of Historic Places in Baltimore
School buildings completed in 1908
Northwest Baltimore
1908 establishments in Maryland